The tricolor shiner (Cyprinella trichroistia) It is endemic to the United States where it occurs in the Alabama River drainage in Alabama, northwestern Georgia, and southeastern Tennessee.

References

https://web.archive.org/web/20130111034246/http://www.bio.utk.edu/hulseylab/Fishlist.html

Cyprinella
Taxa named by David Starr Jordan
Taxa named by Charles Henry Gilbert
Fish described in 1878